Founded in 1949,  is located in Sanbanchō, near the Imperial Palace (Kokyo) in the heart of Chiyoda, Tokyo. It began as a sewing school opened by Otsuma Kotaka (1884–1970) in 1908. From this grew the Otsuma Girls' High School (1935) and the Otsuma Women's Vocational School (1942).

Otsuma Kotaka (大妻コタカ) was a pioneer of traditional women's education, emphasizing scientific training in homemaking skills. For almost twenty years the university specialized in home economics and became synonymous with the education of ‘good wives and wise mothers’ (良妻賢母, ryōsai-kenbo).   A two-year junior college was added in 1950.

In 1967 the university entered a period of diversification with the creation of a Faculty of Language & Literature and a second campus in Sayamadai, Saitama. Two hitherto independent girls' middle and high schools (Otsuma Nakano and Otsuma Ranzan) were also affiliated. In 1990 a third campus and a fourth affiliated high school were opened in Tama, Tokyo.

Like many other women's universities in Japan, Otsuma has faced the challenge of a rapidly changing job market for women. In the 70s and 80s the demand was for junior college graduates and for most of this period the Otsuma Junior College English Department was at the top of the national rankings.

The subsequent shift to a demand for four-year graduates has resulted in the retrenchment of the junior college and the creation of several new faculties, including Social Information Studies and Comparative Cultures. On December 26, 1975, Popular girl group, The Candies performed their concert at that location.

External links 
Otsuma Women's University 
Otsuma Women's University Faculty of Language and Literature
Otsuma Women's University School of Social Information Studies
Otsuma Women's University Faculty of Comparative Cultures

Universities and colleges in Tokyo
Private universities and colleges in Japan
Women's universities and colleges in Japan
Educational institutions established in 1949
1949 establishments in Japan
Tama, Tokyo
Chiyoda, Tokyo